Paphia is a genus of saltwater clam, a marine bivalve mollusk in the subfamily Tapetinae of the family Veneridae, the Venus clams. 

This genus is known in the fossil records from the Cretaceous to the Quaternary (age range: from 112.6 to 0.0 million years ago).

Species
Species within this genus include:
Paphia amabilis (Philippi, 1847) 
Paphia crassisulca (Lamarck, 1818) 
Paphia declivis (G. B. Sowerby II, 1852) 
Paphia euglypta (Philippi, 1847) 
†Paphia finlayi Marwick, 1927
Paphia inflata (Deshayes, 1854) 
†Paphia japonica (Ando, 1953)
Paphia kreipli M. Huber, 2010
Paphia lirata (Philippi, 1848) 
 Paphia lutaenkoi Thach, 2018
Paphia philippiana M. Huber, 2010
Paphia polita (G. B. Sowerby II, 1852) 
Paphia rotundata (Linnaeus, 1758) 
Paphia schnelliana (Dunker, 1865) 
Paphia semirugata (Philippi, 1847) 
Paphia sulcosa (Philippi, 1847) 
Paphia vernicosa (Gould, 1861) 
†Paphia vetula (Basterot, 1825)

 Paphia textile (Gmelin, 1791) has been designated a synonym of Paratapes textilis (Gmelin, 1791).

 Paphia undulata (Born, 1778) has been designated a synonym of Paratapes undulatus (Born, 1778).

References

 Chiamenti, A. (1900). Contribuzione alio studio della Malacofauna Adriatica. Nota sulla famiglia della Veneridae, e della Petricolidae. Rivista Italiana di Scienze Naturali. 20(1-2): 9-15
 Nevesskaja L.A., Popov S.V., Goncharova I.A., Guzhov A.V., Janin B.T., Polubotko A.V., Biakov A.S., Gavrilova V.A. (2013). Phanerozoic Bivalvia of Russia and surrounding countries [= Двустворчатые моллюски России и сопредельных стран в фанерозое]. Trudy Paleontologicheskogo Instituta Rossiyskoy Akademii Nauk. 294: 1-524 page(s): 401
 MacNae, W. & M. Kalk (eds). (1958). A natural history of Inhaca Island, Mozambique. Witwatersrand Univ. Press, Johannesburg. I-iv, 163 pp.
 Vaught, K.C.; Tucker Abbott, R.; Boss, K.J. (1989). A classification of the living Mollusca. American Malacologists: Melbourne. ISBN 0-915826-22-4. XII, 195 pp.

External links
 Röding, P.F. (1798). Museum Boltenianum sive Catalogus cimeliorum e tribus regnis naturæ quæ olim collegerat Joa. Fried Bolten, M. D. p. d. per XL. annos proto physicus Hamburgensis. Pars secunda continens Conchylia sive Testacea univalvia, bivalvia & multivalvia. Trapp, Hamburg. viii, 199 pp
 Gofas, S.; Le Renard, J.; Bouchet, P. (2001). Mollusca. in: Costello, M.J. et al. (eds), European Register of Marine Species: a check-list of the marine species in Europe and a bibliography of guides to their identification. Patrimoines Naturels. 50: 180-213

Veneridae
Bivalve genera